A Pool User (PU) is a client in the Reliable Server Pooling (RSerPool) framework. 

In order to use the service provided by a pool, a PU has to proceed the following steps:
 Ask a Pool Registrar for server selection (the Pool Registrar will return a list of servers, called Pool Elements),
 Select one Pool Element, establish a connection and use the actual service,
 Repeat the server selection and connection establishment procedure in case of server failures,
 Perform an application-specific session failover to a new server to resume an interrupted session,
 Report failed servers to the Pool Registrar.

Standards Documents 
 Aggregate Server Access Protocol (ASAP)
 Endpoint Handlespace Redundancy Protocol (ENRP)
 Aggregate Server Access Protocol (ASAP) and Endpoint Handlespace Redundancy Protocol (ENRP) Parameters
 Reliable Server Pooling Policies

External links 
 Thomas Dreibholz's Reliable Server Pooling (RSerPool) Page
 IETF RSerPool Working Group

Internet protocols
Internet Standards